The New York Times (the Times or NYT), also referred to as the Gray Lady, is a daily newspaper based in New York City with a worldwide readership reported in 2022 to comprise 740,000 paid print subscribers, and 8.6 million paid digital subscribers. It also is a producer of popular podcasts such as The Daily. Founded in 1851, it is published by The New York Times Company. The Times has won 132 Pulitzer Prizes, the most of any newspaper, and has long been regarded as a national "newspaper of record". For print, it is ranked 18th in the world by circulation and 3rd in the United States. The newspaper is headquartered at The New York Times Building in Times Square, Manhattan.

The New York Times Company, which is publicly traded, has been governed by the Sulzberger family since 1896, through a dual-class share structure. A. G. Sulzberger, the paper's publisher and the company's chairman, is the fifth generation of the family to head the paper.

Since the mid-1970s, The New York Times has expanded its layout and organization, adding special weekly sections on various topics supplementing the regular news, editorials, sports, and features. Since 2008, the Times has been organized into the following sections: News, Editorials/Opinions-Columns/Op-Ed, New York (metropolitan), Business, Sports, Arts, Science, Styles, Home, Travel, and other features. On Sundays, the Times is supplemented by the Sunday Review (formerly the Week in Review), The New York Times Book Review, The New York Times Magazine, and T: The New York Times Style Magazine. The editorial pages of The New York Times considers itself typically liberal in its positions.

History

Origins 

The New York Times was founded as the New-York Daily Times on September 18, 1851. Founded by journalist and politician Henry Jarvis Raymond and former banker George Jones, the Times was initially published by Raymond, Jones & Company. Early investors in the company included Edwin B. Morgan, Christopher Morgan, and Edward B. Wesley. Sold for a penny, the inaugural edition attempted to address various speculations on its purpose and positions that preceded its release:

In 1852, the newspaper started a western division, The Times of California, which arrived whenever a mail boat from New York docked in California. The effort failed once local California newspapers came into prominence.

On September 14, 1857, the newspaper officially shortened its name to The New-York Times. The hyphen in the city name was dropped on December 1, 1896. On April 21, 1861, The New York Times began publishing a Sunday edition to offer daily coverage of the Civil War.

The main office of The New York Times was attacked during the New York City draft riots. The riots, sparked by the institution of a draft for the Union Army, began on July 13, 1863. On "Newspaper Row", across from City Hall, co-founder Henry Raymond stopped the rioters with Gatling guns, early machine guns, one of which he wielded himself. The mob diverted, instead attacking the headquarters of abolitionist publisher Horace Greeley's New York Tribune until being forced to flee by the Brooklyn City Police, who had crossed the East River to help the Manhattan authorities.

In 1869, Henry Raymond died, and George Jones took over as publisher.

The newspaper's influence grew in 1870 and 1871, when it published a series of exposés on William Tweed, leader of the city's Democratic Party — popularly known as "Tammany Hall" (from its early-19th-century meeting headquarters)—that led to the end of the Tweed Ring's domination of New York's City Hall. Tweed had offered The New York Times five million dollars (equivalent to  million dollars in ) to not publish the story.

In the 1880s, The New York Times gradually transitioned from supporting Republican Party candidates in its editorials to becoming more politically independent and analytical. In 1884, the paper supported Democrat Grover Cleveland (former mayor of Buffalo and governor of New York) in his first presidential campaign. While this move cost The New York Times a portion of its readership among its more Republican readers (revenue declined from $188,000 to $56,000 from 1883 to 1884), the paper eventually regained most of its lost ground within a few years.

Ochs era 
After George Jones died in 1891, Charles Ransom Miller and other New York Times editors raised $1 million (equivalent to $ million in ) to buy the Times, printing it under the New York Times Publishing Company. The newspaper found itself in a financial crisis by the Panic of 1893, and by 1896, the newspaper had a circulation of less than 9,000 and was losing $1,000 a day. That year, Adolph Ochs, the publisher of the Chattanooga Times, gained a controlling interest in the company for $75,000.

Shortly after assuming control of the paper, Ochs coined the paper's slogan, "All The News That's Fit To Print". This slogan has endured, appearing in the paper since September 1896, and has been printed in a box in the upper left hand corner of the front page since early 1897. The slogan was seen as a jab at competing publications, such as Joseph Pulitzer's New York World and William Randolph Hearst's New York Journal, which were known for a lurid, sensationalist and often inaccurate reporting of facts and opinions, described by the end of the century as "yellow journalism". Under Ochs' guidance, aided by Carr Van Anda, The New York Times achieved international scope, circulation, and reputation; Sunday circulation went from under 9,000 in 1896 to 780,000 in 1934. Van Anda also created the newspaper's photo library, now colloquially referred to as "the morgue". In 1904, during the Russo-Japanese War, The New York Times, along with The Times, received the first on-the-spot wireless telegraph transmission from a naval battle: a report of the destruction of the Russian Navy's Baltic Fleet, at the Battle of Port Arthur, from the press-boat Haimun. In 1910, the first air delivery of The New York Times to Philadelphia began. In 1919, The New York Times first trans-Atlantic delivery to London occurred by dirigible balloon. In 1920, during the 1920 Republican National Convention, a "4 A.M. Airplane Edition" was sent to Chicago by plane, so it could be in the hands of convention delegates by evening.

In 1920, Walter Lippmann and Charles Merz published "A Test of the News", about the Times coverage of the Russian Revolution. They concluded that its news stories were not based on facts, but "were determined by the hopes of the men who made up the news organisations." The newspaper referred to events that had not taken place, atrocities that did not exist, and reported no fewer than 91 times that the Bolshevik regime was on the verge of collapse.

Later expansion 

Ochs died in 1935 and was succeeded as publisher by his son-in-law, Arthur Hays Sulzberger. Under his leadership, and that of his son-in-law (and successor), Orvil Dryfoos, the paper extended its breadth and reach, beginning in the 1940s. On June 22, 1941 The New York Times published an abridged English translation of the German declaration of war on the Soviet Union. The newspaper's crossword began appearing regularly in 1942, and the fashion section first appeared in 1946. The New York Times began an international edition in 1946 (the international edition stopped publishing in 1967, when The New York Times joined the owners of the New York Herald Tribune and The Washington Post to publish the International Herald Tribune in Paris).

After only two years as publisher, Dryfoos died in 1963 and was succeeded by his brother-in-law, Arthur Ochs "Punch" Sulzberger, who led the Times until 1992 and continued the expansion of the paper.

New York Times v. Sullivan (1964)

The paper's involvement in a 1964 libel case helped bring one of the key United States Supreme Court decisions supporting freedom of the press, New York Times Co. v. Sullivan. In it, the United States Supreme Court established the "actual malice" standard for press reports about public officials or public figures to be considered defamatory or libelous. The malice standard requires the plaintiff in a defamation or libel case to prove the publisher of the statement knew the statement was false or acted in reckless disregard of its truth or falsity. Because of the high burden of proof on the plaintiff, and difficulty proving malicious intent, such cases by public figures rarely succeed.

The Pentagon Papers (1971)

In 1971, the Pentagon Papers, a secret United States Department of Defense history of the United States' political and military involvement in the Vietnam War from 1945 to 1967, were given ("leaked") to Neil Sheehan of The New York Times by former State Department official Daniel Ellsberg, with his friend Anthony Russo assisting in copying them. The New York Times began publishing excerpts as a series of articles on June 13. Controversy and lawsuits followed. The papers revealed, among other things, that the government had deliberately expanded its role in the war by conducting airstrikes over Laos, raids along the coast of North Vietnam, and offensive actions were taken by the U.S. Marines well before the public was told about the actions, all while President Lyndon B. Johnson had been promising not to expand the war. The document increased the credibility gap for the U.S. government, and hurt efforts by the Nixon administration to fight the ongoing war.

When The New York Times began publishing its series, President Richard Nixon became incensed. His words to National Security Advisor Henry Kissinger included "People have gotta be put to the torch for this sort of thing" and "Let's get the son-of-a-bitch in jail." After failing to get The New York Times to stop publishing, Attorney General John Mitchell and President Nixon obtained a federal court injunction that The New York Times cease publication of excerpts. The newspaper appealed and the case began working through the court system.

On June 18, 1971, The Washington Post began publishing its own series. Ben Bagdikian, a Post editor, had obtained portions of the papers from Ellsberg. That day the Post received a call from William Rehnquist, an assistant U.S. Attorney General for the Office of Legal Counsel, asking them to stop publishing. When the Post refused, the U.S. Justice Department sought another injunction. The U.S. District court judge refused, and the government appealed.

On June 26, 1971, the U.S. Supreme Court agreed to take both cases, merging them into New York Times Co. v. United States. On June 30, 1971, the Supreme Court held in a 6–3 decision that the injunctions were unconstitutional prior restraints and that the government had not met the burden of proof required. The justices wrote nine separate opinions, disagreeing on significant substantive issues. While it was generally seen as a victory for those who claim the First Amendment enshrines an absolute right to free speech, many felt it a lukewarm victory, offering little protection for future publishers when claims of national security were at stake.

Late 1970s–1990s 
In the 1970s, the paper introduced a number of new lifestyle sections, including Weekend and Home, with the aim of attracting more advertisers and readers. Many criticized the move for betraying the paper's mission. On September 7, 1976, the paper switched from an eight-column format to a six-column format. The overall page width stayed the same, with each column becoming wider.

In 1992, "Punch" Sulzberger stepped down as publisher; his son, Arthur Ochs Sulzberger Jr., succeeded him, first as publisher and then as chairman of the board in 1997. The Times was one of the last newspapers to adopt color photography, with the first color photograph on the front page appearing on October 16, 1997.

Digital era

Early digital content 

The New York Times switched to a digital production process sometime before 1980, but only began preserving the resulting digital text that year. In 1983, the Times sold the electronic rights to its articles to LexisNexis. As the online distribution of news increased in the 1990s, the Times decided not to renew the deal and in 1994 the newspaper regained electronic rights to its articles. On January 22, 1996, NYTimes.com began publishing.

2000s 
This followed similar moves by a roster of other newspapers in the previous ten years, including USA Today, The Wall Street Journal, and The Washington Post. The move resulted in a 5% reduction in news space, but (in an era of dwindling circulation and significant advertising revenue losses) also saved about $12 million a year.

In September 2008, The New York Times announced that it would be combining certain sections effective October 6, 2008, in editions printed in the New York metropolitan area. The changes folded the Metro Section into the main International / National news section and combined Sports and Business (except Saturday through Monday, while Sports continues to be printed as a standalone section). This change also included having the Metro section called New York outside of the Tri-State Area. The presses used by The New York Times can allow four sections to be printed simultaneously; as the paper includes more than four sections on all days except for Saturday, the sections were required to be printed separately in an early press run and collated together. The changes allowed The New York Times to print in four sections Monday through Wednesday, in addition to Saturday. The New York Times announcement stated that the number of news pages and employee positions would remain unchanged, with the paper realizing cost savings by cutting overtime expenses.

Because of its declining sales largely attributed to the rise of online news sources, favored especially by younger readers, and the decline of advertising revenue, the newspaper had been going through a downsizing for several years, offering buyouts to workers and cutting expenses, in common with a general trend among print news media. Following industry trends, its weekday circulation had fallen in 2009 to fewer than one million.

In 2009, the newspaper began production of local inserts in regions outside of the New York area. Beginning October 16, 2009, a two-page "Bay Area" insert was added to copies of the Northern California edition on Fridays and Sundays. The newspaper commenced production of a similar Friday and Sunday insert to the Chicago edition on November 20, 2009. The inserts consist of local news, policy, sports, and culture pieces, usually supported by local advertisements.

2010s 
In December 2012, the Times published "Snow Fall", a six-part article about the 2012 Tunnel Creek avalanche which integrated videos, photos, and interactive graphics and was hailed as a watershed moment for online journalism.

In 2013, "How Y’all, Youse and You Guys Talk," an interactive quiz created by intern Josh Katz, based on the Harvard Dialect Survey, which collected responses of more than 50,000 people answering 122 questions about the way they said different things across the United States became the Times most popular piece of content of the year.

In 2016, reporters for the newspaper were reportedly the target of cybersecurity breaches. The Federal Bureau of Investigation was reportedly investigating the attacks. The cybersecurity breaches have been described as possibly being related to cyberattacks that targeted other institutions, such as the Democratic National Committee.

During the 2016 presidential election, the Times played an important role in elevating the Hillary Clinton emails controversy into the most important subject of media coverage in the election which Clinton would lose narrowly to Donald Trump. The controversy received more media coverage than any other topic during the presidential campaign. Clinton and other observers argue that coverage of the emails controversy contributed to her loss in the election. According to a Columbia Journalism Review analysis, "in just six days, The New York Times ran as many cover stories about Hillary Clinton's emails as they did about all policy issues combined in the 69 days leading up to the election (and that does not include the three additional articles on October 18, and November 6 and 7, or the two articles on the emails taken from John Podesta)."

In October 2018, the Times published a 14,218-word investigation into Donald Trump's "self-made" fortune and tax avoidance, an 18-month project based on examination of 100,000 pages of documents. The extensive article ran as an eight-page feature in the print edition and also was adapted into a shortened 2,500 word listicle featuring its key takeaways. After the midweek front-page story, the Times also republished the piece as a 12-page "special report" section in the Sunday paper. During the lengthy investigation, Showtime cameras followed the Times three investigative reporters for a half-hour documentary called The Family Business: Trump and Taxes, which aired the following Sunday. The report won a Pulitzer Prize for Explanatory Reporting.

In May 2019, The New York Times announced that it would present a television news program based on news from its individual reporters stationed around the world and that it would premiere on FX and Hulu.

2020s 
In August 2021, the paper announced an effort to make 18 newsletters—from authors like Tressie McMillan Cottom, Jay Caspian Kang, Kara Swisher, Tish Harrison Warren, and John McWhorter—available only to subscribers, even though some of the most popular ones would remain free. Part of this was in response to competition from Substack.

In January 2022, the New York Times Company announced that it would acquire The Athletic, a subscription-based sports news website. The $550 million deal is expected to close in the first quarter of 2022, and The Athletic's co-founders, Alex Mather and Adam Hansmann, would stay with the publication, which would continue to be run separately from the Times. Recode/Vox reported that this acquisition was part of an effort for the paper to get a younger, more diverse readership, as were offerings like games, cooking, and audio. The same month, the paper announced it was acquiring Wordle, a relatively new game that became popular rather quickly and that would remain free "initially."

In April 2022, The New York Times published a three-part 20,000-word investigative series on Fox News host Tucker Carlson called "American Nationalist". The investigative series documents Carlson's rise to prominence and his rhetoric on immigration, race relations and the COVID-19 pandemic. Carlson responded by saying that he has not read "American Nationalist" and does not plan to. He also denied allegations from the Times about obsessing over ratings, saying that "I've never read the ratings a single day in my life. I don't even know how. Ask anyone at Fox," and that "Most of the big positions I've taken in the past five years—against the neocons, the vax and the war [in Ukraine]—have been very unpopular with our audience at first."

In December 2022, over 1,000 Times staffers staged a strike for the first time in over 40 years.

Headquarters building
The newspaper's first building was located at 113 Nassau Street in New York City. In 1854, it moved to 138 Nassau Street, and in 1858 to 41 Park Row, making it the first newspaper in New York City housed in a building built specifically for its use.

The newspaper moved its headquarters to the Times Tower, located at 1475 Broadway in 1904, in an area then called Longacre Square, that was later renamed Times Square in the newspaper's honor. The top of the building—now known as One Times Square—is the site of the New Year's Eve tradition of lowering a lighted ball, which was begun by the paper. The building is also known for its electronic news ticker—popularly known as "The Zipper"—where headlines crawl around the outside of the building. It is still in use, but has been operated by Dow Jones & Company since 1995. After nine years in its Times Square tower, the newspaper had an annex built at 229 West 43rd Street. After several expansions, the 43rd Street building became the newspaper's main headquarters in 1960 and the Times Tower on Broadway was sold the following year. It served as the newspaper's main printing plant until 1997, when the newspaper opened a state-of-the-art printing plant in the College Point section of Queens.

A decade later, The New York Times moved its newsroom and businesses headquarters from West 43rd Street to a new tower at 620 Eighth Avenue between West 40th and 41st Streets, in Manhattan, directly across Eighth Avenue from the Port Authority Bus Terminal. The new headquarters for the newspaper, known officially as The New York Times Building but unofficially called the new "Times Tower" by many New Yorkers, is a skyscraper designed by Renzo Piano.

Gender discrimination in employment
Until after World War II the National Press Club's rules limited coverage of speeches by world leaders there to male reporters. When women were eventually allowed to hear the speeches directly, they were still not allowed to ask the speakers questions. Men were allowed and did ask, even though some of the women had won Pulitzer Prizes for prior work. Times reporter Maggie Hunter refused to return to the club after covering one speech on assignment. Nan Robertson's article on the Union Stock Yards, Chicago, was read aloud as anonymous by a professor, who then said: "'It will come as a surprise to you, perhaps, that the reporter is a girl, he began... [G]asps; amazement in the ranks. 'She had used all her senses, not just her eyes, to convey the smell and feel of the stockyards. She chose a difficult subject, an offensive subject. Her imagery was strong enough to revolt you.'" The New York Times hired Kathleen McLaughlin after ten years at the Chicago Tribune, where "[s]he did a series on maids, going out herself to apply for housekeeping jobs."

The Times first general female reporter was Jane Grant, who described her experience afterward: "In the beginning I was charged not to reveal the fact that a female had been hired". Other reporters nicknamed her Fluff and she was subjected to considerable hazing. Because of her gender, any promotion was out of the question, according to the then-managing editor. She remained on the staff for fifteen years, interrupted by World War I.

In 1935, Anne McCormick wrote to Arthur Hays Sulzberger: "I hope you won't expect me to revert to 'woman's-point-of-view' stuff." Later, she interviewed major political leaders and appears to have had easier access than her colleagues. Even witnesses of her actions were unable to explain how she gained the interviews she did. Clifton Daniel said, "[After World War II,] I'm sure Adenauer called her up and invited her to lunch. She never had to grovel for an appointment."

Slogan 
The New York Times has had one slogan. Since 1896, the newspaper's slogan has been "All the News That's Fit to Print". In 1896, Adolph Ochs held a competition to attempt to find a replacement slogan, offering a $100 prize for the best one. Though he later announced that the original would not be changed, the prize would still be awarded. Entries included "News, Not Nausea"; "In One Word: Adequate"; "News Without Noise"; "Out Heralds The Herald, Informs The World, and Extinguishes The Sun"; "The Public Press is a Public Trust"; and the winner of the competition, "All the world's news, but not a school for scandal." On May 10, 1960, Wright Patman asked the FTC to investigate whether The New York Times slogan was misleading or false advertising. Within 10 days, the FTC responded that it was not.

Again in 1996, a competition was held to find a new slogan, this time for NYTimes.com. Over 8,000 entries were submitted, with "All the News That's Fit to Print" found to be the best.

Organization
 Meredith Kopit Levien has been president and chief executive officer since September 2020.

News staff 
In addition to its New York City headquarters, the paper has newsrooms in London and Hong Kong. Its Paris newsroom, which had been the headquarters of the paper's international edition, was closed in 2016, although the city remains home to a news bureau and an advertising office. The paper also has an editing and wire service center in Gainesville, Florida.

, the newspaper had six news bureaus in the New York region, 14 elsewhere in the United States, and 24 in other countries.

In 2009, Russ Stanton, editor of the Los Angeles Times, a competitor, stated that the newsroom of The New York Times was twice the size of the Los Angeles Times, which had a newsroom of 600 at the time.

To facilitate their reporting and to hasten an otherwise lengthy process of reviewing many documents during preparation for publication, their interactive news team has adapted optical character recognition technology into a proprietary tool known as Document Helper. It enables the team to accelerate the processing of documents that need to be reviewed. During March 2019, they documented that this tool enabled them to process 900 documents in less than ten minutes in preparation for reporters to review the contents.

The newspaper's editorial staff, including over 3,000 reporters and media staff, are unionized with NewsGuild. In 2021, the Times digital technology staff formed a union with NewsGuild, which the company declined to voluntarily recognize.

Ochs-Sulzberger family 
In 1896, Adolph Ochs bought The New York Times, a money-losing newspaper, and formed the New York Times Company. The Ochs-Sulzberger family, one of the United States' newspaper dynasties, has owned The New York Times ever since. The publisher went public on January 14, 1969, trading at $42 a share on the American Stock Exchange. After this, the family continued to exert control through its ownership of the vast majority of Class B voting shares. Class A shareholders are permitted restrictive voting rights, while Class B shareholders are allowed open voting rights.

The Ochs-Sulzberger family trust controls roughly 88 percent of the company's class B shares. Any alteration to the dual-class structure must be ratified by six of eight directors who sit on the board of the Ochs-Sulzberger family trust. The trust board members are Daniel H. Cohen, James M. Cohen, Lynn G. Dolnick, Susan W. Dryfoos, Michael Golden, Eric M. A. Lax, Arthur O. Sulzberger Jr., and Cathy J. Sulzberger.

Turner Catledge, the top editor at The New York Times from 1952 to 1968, wanted to hide the ownership influence. Arthur Sulzberger routinely wrote memos to his editor, each containing suggestions, instructions, complaints, and orders. When Catledge would receive these memos, he would erase the publisher's identity before passing them to his subordinates. Catledge thought that if he removed the publisher's name from the memos, it would protect reporters from feeling pressured by the owner.

Public editors
The position of public editor was established in 2003 to "investigate matters of journalistic integrity"; each public editor was to serve a two-year term. The post "was established to receive reader complaints and question Times journalists on how they make decisions." The impetus for the creation of the public editor position was the Jayson Blair affair. Public editors were: Daniel Okrent (2003–2005), Byron Calame (2005–2007), Clark Hoyt (2007–2010) (served an extra year), Arthur S. Brisbane (2010–2012), Margaret Sullivan (2012–2016) (served a four-year term), and Elizabeth Spayd (2016–2017). In 2017, the Times eliminated the position of public editor.

Content

Editorial stance

The editorial pages of The New York Times are typically liberal in their position. In mid-2004, the newspaper's then public editor (ombudsman), Daniel Okrent, wrote that "the Op-Ed page editors do an evenhanded job of representing a range of views in the essays from outsiders they publish – but you need an awfully heavy counterweight to balance a page that also bears the work of seven opinionated columnists, only two of whom could be classified as conservative (and, even then, of the conservative subspecies that supports legalization of gay unions and, in the case of William Safire, opposes some central provisions of the Patriot Act)."

The New York Times has not endorsed a Republican Party member for president since Dwight D. Eisenhower in 1956; since 1960, it has endorsed the Democratic Party nominee in every presidential election (see New York Times presidential endorsements). The New York Times did endorse incumbent moderate Republican mayors of New York City Rudy Giuliani in 1997, and Michael Bloomberg in 2005 and 2009. The Times also endorsed Republican New York state governor George Pataki for re-election in 2002.

Style
Unlike most U.S. daily newspapers, the Times relies on its own in-house stylebook rather than The Associated Press Stylebook. When referring to people, The New York Times generally uses honorifics rather than unadorned last names (except in the sports pages, pop culture coverage, and the Book Review and Magazine).

The New York Times printed a display advertisement on its first page on January 6, 2009, breaking tradition at the paper. The advertisement, for CBS, was in color and ran the entire width of the page. The newspaper promised it would place first-page advertisements on only the lower half of the page.

In August 2014, the Times decided to use the word "torture" to describe incidents in which interrogators "inflicted pain on a prisoner in an effort to get information." This was a shift from the paper's previous practice of describing such practices as "harsh" or "brutal" interrogations.

The paper maintains a strict profanity policy. A 2007 review of a concert by the punk band Fucked Up, for example, completely avoided mention of the group's name. The Times has on occasion published unfiltered video content that includes profanity and slurs where it has determined that such video has news value. During the 2016 U.S. presidential election campaign, the Times did print the words "fuck" and "pussy," among others, when reporting on the vulgar statements made by Donald Trump in a 2005 recording. Then-Times politics editor Carolyn Ryan said: "It's a rare thing for us to use this language in our stories, even in quotes, and we discussed it at length." Ryan said the paper ultimately decided to publish it because of its news value and because "[t]o leave it out or simply describe it seemed awkward and less than forthright to us, especially given that we would be running a video that showed our readers exactly what was said."

Products

Print newspaper 
In the absence of a major headline, the day's most important story generally appears in the top-right column, on the main page. The typefaces used for the headlines are custom variations of Cheltenham. The running text is set at 8.7 point Imperial.

The newspaper is organized into three sections, including the magazine:
 News: Includes International, National, Washington, Business, Technology, Science, Health, Sports, The Metro Section, Education, Weather, and Obituaries.
 Opinion: Includes Editorials, Op-eds and Letters to the Editor.
 Features: Includes Arts, Movies, Theater, Travel, NYC Guide, Food, Home & Garden, Fashion & Style, Crossword, The New York Times Book Review, T: The New York Times Style Magazine, The New York Times Magazine, and Sunday Review.

Some sections, such as Metro, are only found in the editions of the paper distributed in the New York–New Jersey–Connecticut tri-state area and not in the national or Washington, D.C. editions. Aside from a weekly roundup of reprints of editorial cartoons from other newspapers, The New York Times does not have its own staff editorial cartoonist, nor does it feature a comics page or Sunday comics section.

From 1851 to 2017, The New York Times published around 60,000 print issues containing about 3.5 million pages and 15 million articles.

Like most other American newspapers, The New York Times has experienced a decline in circulation. Its printed weekday circulation dropped by  percent to 540,000 copies from 2005 to 2017.

International Edition 
The New York Times International Edition is a print version of the paper tailored for readers outside the United States. Formerly a joint venture with The Washington Post named The International Herald Tribune, The New York Times took full ownership of the paper in 2002 and has gradually integrated it more closely into its domestic operations.

Website
The New York Times began publishing daily on the World Wide Web on January 22, 1996, "offering readers around the world immediate access to most of the daily newspaper's contents." The website had 555 million pageviews and 15 million unique visitors in March 2005. By March 2020, this had risen to 2.5 billion pageviews and 240 million unique visitors.

, nytimes.com produced 22 of the 50 most popular newspaper blogs.

As of August 2020, the company had 6.5 million paid subscribers, out of which 5.7 million were subscribed to its digital content. In the period April–June 2020, it added 669,000 new digital subscribers.

Food section 
The food section is supplemented on the web by properties for home cooks and for out-of-home dining. The New York Times Cooking (cooking.nytimes.com; also available via iOS app) provides access to more than 17,000 recipes on file , and availability of saving recipes from other sites around the web. The newspaper's restaurant search (nytimes.com/reviews/dining) allows online readers to search NYC area restaurants by cuisine, neighborhood, price, and reviewer rating. The New York Times has also published several cookbooks, including The Essential New York Times Cookbook: Classic Recipes for a New Century, published in late 2010.

TimesSelect 
In September 2005, the paper decided to begin subscription-based service for daily columns in a program known as TimesSelect, which encompassed many previously free columns. Until being discontinued two years later, TimesSelect cost $7.95 per month or $49.95 per year, though it was free for print copy subscribers and university students and faculty. To avoid this charge, bloggers often reposted TimesSelect material, and at least one site once compiled links of reprinted material.

On September 17, 2007, The New York Times announced that it would stop charging for access to parts of its Web site, effective at midnight the following day, reflecting a growing view in the industry that subscription fees cannot outweigh the potential ad revenue from increased traffic on a free site.

Times columnists including Nicholas Kristof and Thomas Friedman had criticized TimesSelect, with Friedman going so far as to say "I hate it. It pains me enormously because it's cut me off from a lot, a lot of people, especially because I have a lot of people reading me overseas, like in India ... I feel totally cut off from my audience."

Paywall and digital subscriptions 
In 2007, in addition to opening almost the entire site to all readers, The New York Times news archives from 1987 to the present were made available at no charge to non-subscribers, as well as those from 1851 to 1922, which are in the public domain.

Falling print advertising revenue and projections of continued decline resulted in a "metered paywall" being instituted in March 2011, limiting non-subscribers to a monthly allotment of 20 free on-line articles per month. This measure was regarded as modestly successful after garnering several hundred thousand subscriptions and about $100 million in revenue .

Beginning in April 2012, the number of free-access articles was halved from 20 to 10 articles per month. Any reader who wanted to access more would have to pay for a digital subscription. This plan allowed free access for occasional readers. Digital subscription rates for four weeks ranged from $15 to $35 depending on the package selected, with periodic new subscriber promotions offering four-week all-digital access for as low as 99¢. Subscribers to the paper's print edition got full access without any additional fee. Some content, such as the front page and section fronts remained free, as well as the Top News page on mobile apps. In January 2013, The New York Times Public Editor Margaret M. Sullivan announced that for the first time in many decades, the paper generated more revenue through subscriptions than through advertising.

In December 2017, the number of free articles per month was reduced from 10 to 5, the first change to the metered paywall since April 2012. An executive of the New York Times Company stated that the decision was motivated by "an all-time high" in the demand for journalism. A digital subscription to The New York Times cost $16 a month in 2017. , The New York Times had a total of 3.5 million paid subscriptions in both print and digital versions, and about 130 million monthly readers, more than double its audience two years previously. In February 2018, the New York Times Company reported increased revenue from the digital-only subscriptions, adding 157,000 new subscribers to a total of 2.6 million digital-only subscribers. Digital advertising also saw growth during this period. At the same time, advertising for the print version of the journal fell.

Mobile presence

Apps 
In 2008, The New York Times was made available as an app for the iPhone and iPod Touch; as well as publishing an iPad app in 2010. The app allowed users to download articles to their mobile device enabling them to read the paper even when they were unable to receive a signal. , The New York Times iPad app is ad-supported and available for free without a paid subscription, but translated into a subscription-based model in 2011.

In 2010, The New York Times editors collaborated with students and faculty from New York University's Studio 20 Journalism Masters program to launch and produce "The Local East Village", a hyperlocal blog designed to offer news "by, for and about the residents of the East Village". That same year, reCAPTCHA helped to digitize old editions of The New York Times.

In 2010, the newspaper also launched an app for Android smartphones, followed later by an app for Windows Phones.

Moreover, the Times was the first newspaper to offer a video game as part of its editorial content, Food Import Folly by Persuasive Games.

The Times Reader 
The Times Reader is a digital version of The New York Times, created via a collaboration between the newspaper and Microsoft. Times Reader takes the principles of print journalism and applies them to the technique of online reporting, using a series of technologies developed by Microsoft and their Windows Presentation Foundation team. It was announced in Seattle in April 2006, by Arthur Ochs Sulzberger Jr., Bill Gates, and Tom Bodkin.

In 2009, the Times Reader 2.0 was rewritten in Adobe AIR. In December 2013, the newspaper announced that the Times Reader app would be discontinued as of January 6, 2014, urging readers of the app to instead begin using the subscription-only Today's Paper app.

Podcasts
The New York Times began producing podcasts in 2006. Among the early podcasts were Inside The Times and Inside The New York Times Book Review. Several of the Times' podcasts were cancelled in 2012.

The Times returned to launching new podcasts in 2016, including Modern Love with WBUR. On January 30, 2017, The New York Times launched a news podcast, The Daily. In October 2018, NYT debuted The Argument with opinion columnists Ross Douthat, Michelle Goldberg and David Leonhardt. It is a weekly discussion about a single issue explained from the left, center, and right of the political spectrum.

Non-English versions

Chinese-language
In June 2012, The New York Times introduced its first official foreign-language variant, cn.nytimes.com, a Chinese-language news site viewable in both traditional and simplified Chinese characters. The project was led by Craig S. Smith on the business side and Philip P. Pan on the editorial side, with content created by staff based in Shanghai, Beijing, and Hong Kong, though the server was placed outside of China to avoid censorship issues.

The site's initial success was interrupted in October that year following the publication of an investigative article by David Barboza about the finances of Chinese Premier Wen Jiabao's family. In retaliation for the article, the Chinese government blocked access to both nytimes.com and cn.nytimes.com inside the People's Republic of China (PRC).

Despite Chinese government interference, the Chinese-language operations continued to develop, briefly adding a second site, cn.nytstyle.com, iOS and Android apps, and newsletters, some of which are accessible inside the PRC. The China operations also produce print publications in Chinese. Traffic to cn.nytimes.com, meanwhile, has risen due to the widespread use of VPN technology in the PRC and to a growing Chinese audience outside mainland China. The New York Times articles are also available to users in China via the use of mirror websites, apps, domestic newspapers, and social media. The Chinese platforms now represent one of The New York Times top five digital markets globally. The editor-in-chief of the Chinese platforms is Ching-Ching Ni.

The New York Times en Español (Spanish-language) 
Between February 2016 and September 2019, The New York Times launched a standalone Spanish-language edition, The New York Times en Español. The Spanish-language version featured increased coverage of news and events in Latin America and Spain. The expansion into Spanish language news content allowed the newspaper to expand its audience into the Spanish speaking world and increase its revenue. The Spanish-language version was seen as a way to compete with the established El País newspaper of Spain, which bills itself the "global newspaper in Spanish." Its Spanish version has a team of journalists in Mexico City as well as correspondents in Venezuela, Brazil, Argentina, Miami, and Madrid, Spain. It was discontinued in September 2019, citing lack of financial success as the reason.

In March 2013, The New York Times and National Film Board of Canada announced a partnership titled A Short History of the Highrise, which will create four short documentaries for the Internet about life in high rise buildings as part of the NFB's Highrise project, utilizing images from the newspaper's photo archives for the first three films, and user-submitted images for the final film. The third project in the Short History of the Highrise series won a Peabody Award in 2013.

TimesMachine
The TimesMachine is a Web-based archive of scanned issues of The New York Times from 1851 through 2002.

Unlike The New York Times online archive, the TimesMachine presents scanned images of the actual newspaper. All non-advertising content can be displayed on a per-story basis in a separate PDF display page and saved for future reference. The archive is available to The New York Times subscribers, whether via home delivery or digital access.

Interruptions
Because of holidays, no editions were printed on November 23, 1851; January 2, 1852; July 4, 1852; January 2, 1853; and January 1, 1854.

Because of strikes, the regular edition of The New York Times was not printed during the following periods:
 September 19, 1923, to September 26, 1923. An unauthorized local union strike prevented the publication of several New York papers, among them The New York Times. During this period "The Combined New York Morning Newspapers," were published with summaries of the news.
 December 12, 1962, to March 31, 1963. Only a western edition was printed because of the 1962–63 New York City newspaper strike.
 September 17, 1965, to October 10, 1965. An international edition was printed, and a weekend edition replaced the Saturday and Sunday papers.
 August 10, 1978, to November 5, 1978. The multi-union 1978 New York City newspaper strike shut down the three major New York City newspapers. No editions of The New York Times were printed. Two months into the strike, a parody of The New York Times called Not The New York Times was distributed in the city, with contributors such as Carl Bernstein, Christopher Cerf, Tony Hendra and George Plimpton.

The newspaper's website was hacked on August 29, 2013, by the Syrian Electronic Army, a hacking group that supports the government of Syrian President Bashar al-Assad. The SEA managed to penetrate the paper's domain name registrar, Melbourne IT, and alter DNS records for The New York Times, putting some of its websites out of service for hours.

Controversies

Ukraine 
Walter Duranty, who served as its Moscow bureau chief from 1922 through 1936, has been criticized for a series of stories in 1931 on the Soviet Union and won a Pulitzer Prize for his work at that time. Criticism rose for his denial of widespread famine, known in Ukraine as the Holodomor, in the early 1930s in which he summarized Soviet propaganda, and the Times published, as fact: "Conditions are bad, but there is no famine".

In 2003, after the Pulitzer Board began a renewed inquiry, the Times hired Mark von Hagen, professor of Russian history at Columbia University, to review Duranty's work. Von Hagen found Duranty's reports to be unbalanced and uncritical, and that they far too often gave voice to Stalinist propaganda. In comments to the press he stated, "For the sake of The New York Times' honor, they should take the prize away." The Ukrainian Weekly covered the efforts to rescind Duranty's prize. The Times has since made a public statement and the Pulitzer committee has declined to rescind the award twice, stating that "Mr. Duranty's 1931 work, measured by today's standards for foreign reporting, falls seriously short. In that regard, the Board's view is similar to that of The New York Times itself."

World War II
Jerold Auerbach, a Guggenheim Fellow and Fulbright Lecturer, wrote in Print to Fit, The New York Times, Zionism and Israel, 1896–2016 that it was of utmost importance to Adolph Ochs, the first Jewish owner of the paper, that in spite of the persecution of Jews in Germany, the Times, through its reporting, should never be classified as a "Jewish newspaper".

After Ochs' death in 1935, his son-in-law Arthur Hays Sulzberger became the publisher of The New York Times and maintained the understanding that no reporting should reflect on the Times as a Jewish newspaper. Sulzberger shared Ochs' concerns about the way Jews were perceived in American society. His apprehensions about judgement were manifested positively by his strong fidelity to the United States. At the same time, within the pages of The New York Times, Sulzberger refused to bring attention to Jews, including the refusal to identify Jews as major victims of Nazi genocide. Instead, many reports of Nazi-ordered slaughter identified Jewish victims as "persons." The Times even opposed the rescue of Jewish refugees.

On November 14, 2001, in The New York Times 150th-anniversary issue, in an article entitled "Turning Away From the Holocaust," former executive editor Max Frankel wrote:
 And then there was failure: none greater than the staggering, staining failure of The New York Times to depict Hitler's methodical extermination of the Jews of Europe as a horror beyond all other horrors in World War II – a Nazi war within the war crying out for illumination. 
According to Frankel, harsh judges of The New York Times "have blamed 'self-hating Jews' and 'anti-Zionists' among the paper's owners and staff." Frankel responded to this criticism by describing the fragile sensibilities of the Jewish owners of The New York Times:
 Then, too, papers owned by Jewish families, like The Times, were plainly afraid to have a society that was still widely anti-Semitic misread their passionate opposition to Hitler as a merely parochial cause. Even some leading Jewish groups hedged their appeals for rescue lest they be accused of wanting to divert wartime energies.

At The Times, the reluctance to highlight the systematic slaughter of Jews was undoubtedly influenced by the views of the publisher, Arthur Hays Sulzberger. He believed strongly and publicly that Judaism was a religion, not a race or nationality – that Jews should be separate only in the way they worshiped. He thought they needed no state or political and social institutions of their own. He went to great lengths to avoid having The Times branded a Jewish newspaper. He resented other publications for emphasizing the Jewishness of people in the news.
In the same article, Frankel quotes Laurel Leff, associate professor of journalism at Northeastern University, who in 2000 had described how the newspaper downplayed Nazi Germany's targeting of Jews for genocide.
November 1942 was a critical month for American Jews. After several months of delay, the U.S. State Department had confirmed already published information that Germany was engaged in the systematic extermination of European Jews. Newspaper reports put the death toll at one million and described the "most ruthless methods," including mass gassings at special camps.
Yet at the beginning of November 1942, Sulzberger lobbied U.S. government officials against the founding of a homeland for Jews to escape to. The Times was silent on the matter of an increase in U.S. immigration quotas to permit more Jews to enter, and "actively supported the British Government's restriction on legal immigration to Palestine even as the persecution of Jews intensified". Sulzberger described Jews as being of no more concern to Nazi Germany than Roman Catholic priests or Christian ministers, and that Jews certainly were not singled out for extermination.

Leff's 2005 book Buried by the Times documents the paper's tendency before, during, and after World War II to place deep inside its daily editions the news stories about the ongoing persecution and extermination of Jews, while obscuring in those stories the special impact of the Nazis' crimes on Jews in particular. Leff attributes this dearth in part to the complex personal and political views of Sulzberger, concerning Jewishness, antisemitism, and Zionism.

Accusations of liberal bias
In 2004, the newspaper's public editor Daniel Okrent said in an opinion piece that The New York Times did have a liberal bias in news coverage of certain social issues such as abortion and same-sex marriage. He stated that this bias reflected the paper's cosmopolitanism, which arose naturally from its roots as a hometown paper of New York City, writing that the coverage of the Timess Arts & Leisure; Culture; and the Sunday Times Magazine trend to the left.If you're examining the paper's coverage of these subjects from a perspective that is neither urban nor Northeastern nor culturally seen-it-all; if you are among the groups The Times treats as strange objects to be examined on a laboratory slide (devout Catholics, gun owners, Orthodox Jews, Texans); if your value system wouldn't wear well on a composite New York Times journalist, then a walk through this paper can make you feel you're traveling in a strange and forbidding world.Times public editor Arthur Brisbane wrote in 2012:When The Times covers a national presidential campaign, I have found that the lead editors and reporters are disciplined about enforcing fairness and balance, and usually succeed in doing so. Across the paper's many departments, though, so many share a kind of political and cultural progressivism — for lack of a better term — that this worldview virtually bleeds through the fabric of The Times.The New York Times public editor (ombudsman) Elizabeth Spayd wrote in 2016 that "Conservatives and even many moderates, see in The Times a blue-state worldview" and accuse it of harboring a liberal bias. Spayd did not analyze the substance of the claim but did opine that the Times is "part of a fracturing media environment that reflects a fractured country. That in turn leads liberals and conservatives toward separate news sources." Times executive editor Dean Baquet stated that he does not believe coverage has a liberal bias:We have to be really careful that people feel like they can see themselves in The New York Times. I want us to be perceived as fair and honest to the world, not just a segment of it. It's a really difficult goal. Do we pull it off all the time? No.

Jayson Blair plagiarism (2003)

In May 2003, The New York Times reporter Jayson Blair was forced to resign from the newspaper after he was caught plagiarizing and fabricating elements of his stories. Some critics contended that Blair's race was a major factor in his hiring and in The New York Times initial reluctance to fire him.

Iraq War (2003–06) 

The Times supported the 2003 invasion of Iraq. On May 26, 2004, more than a year after the war started, the newspaper asserted that some of its articles had not been as rigorous as they should have been, and were insufficiently qualified, frequently overly dependent upon information from Iraqi exiles desiring regime change.
The New York Times admitted "Articles based on dire claims about Iraq tended to get prominent display, while follow-up articles that called the original ones into question were sometimes buried. In some cases, there was no follow-up at all." The paper said it was encouraged to report the claims by "United States officials convinced of the need to intervene in Iraq".

The New York Times was involved in a significant controversy regarding the allegations surrounding Iraq and weapons of mass destruction in September 2002. A front-page story authored by Judith Miller which claimed that the Iraqi government was in the process of developing nuclear weapons was published. Miller's story was cited by officials such as Condoleezza Rice, Colin Powell, and Donald Rumsfeld as part of a campaign to commission the Iraq War. One of Miller's prime sources was Ahmed Chalabi, an Iraqi expatriate who returned to Iraq after the U.S. invasion and held a number of governmental positions culminating in acting oil minister and deputy prime minister from May 2005 until May 2006. In 2005, negotiating a private severance package with Sulzberger, Miller retired after criticisms that her reporting of the lead-up to the Iraq War was factually inaccurate and overly favorable to the position of the Bush administration, for which The New York Times later apologized.

Israeli–Palestinian conflict
A 2003 study in the Harvard International Journal of Press/Politics concluded that The New York Times reporting was more favorable to Israelis than to Palestinians. A 2002 study published in the journal Journalism examined Middle East coverage of the Second Intifada over a one-month period in The New York Times, The Washington Post and the Chicago Tribune. The study authors said that the Times was "the most slanted in a pro-Israeli direction" with a bias "reflected...in its use of headlines, photographs, graphics, sourcing practices, and lead paragraphs."

For its coverage of the Israeli–Palestinian conflict, some (such as Ed Koch) have claimed that the paper is pro-Palestinian, while others (such as As'ad AbuKhalil) have claimed that it is pro-Israel. The Israel Lobby and U.S. Foreign Policy, by political science professors John Mearsheimer and Stephen Walt, alleges The New York Times sometimes criticizes Israeli policies but is not even-handed and is generally pro-Israel. In 2009, the Simon Wiesenthal Center criticized the newspaper for printing cartoons regarding the Israeli-Palestinian conflict that were described as "hideously anti-Semitic".

Israeli Prime Minister Benjamin Netanyahu rejected a proposal to write an article for the paper on grounds of lack of objectivity. A piece in which Thomas Friedman commented that praise given to Netanyahu during a speech at the U.S. Congress was "paid for by the Israel lobby" elicited an apology and clarification from its author.

The 1619 Project 
The 1619 Project, a long-form journalism project re-evaluating slavery and its legacy in the United States led by investigative journalist Nikole Hannah-Jones, has received criticism from some historians.

In December 2019, twelve historians wrote to The New York Times Magazine, expressing concern over what they alleged were inaccuracies and falsehoods fundamental to Hannah-Jones' reporting. The magazine's editor-in-chief, Jake Silverstein, responded to the historians' letter in an editorial, in which he called into question the historical accuracy of some of the letter's claims. In an article in The Atlantic, historian Sean Wilentz responded to Silverstein, writing, "No effort to educate the public in order to advance social justice can afford to dispense with a respect for basic facts" and disputed the accuracy of Silverstein's defense of the project.

In September 2020, the Times updated the opening text of the project website to remove the phrase "understanding 1619 as our true founding" without accompanying editorial notes. Times columnist Bret Stephens wrote that the differences showed that the newspaper was backing away from some of the initiative's more controversial claims. The Times defended its practices, with Hannah-Jones emphasizing how most of the project's content has remained unchanged.

Transgender rights and healthcare 

The New York Times reporting on transgender issues has been criticized for coverage that dehumanizes and stereotypes transgender individuals. A 2012 article covering the death of a trans woman in a fire in Brooklyn was criticized by trans rights activist Janet Mock: "I would expect the New York Times to treat any subject, regardless of their path in life, with dignity." She described the article's depiction as a "demeaning, sexist portrait they painted of girls like us." In 2016, the Times Editorial Board wrote an opinion voicing disapproval of the North Carolina anti-transgender bathroom bill. According to Media Matters, Times coverage of the bill nevertheless "failed to debunk the “bathroom predator” myth ... choosing instead to create a false equivalency by uncritically presenting comments from both opponents and supporters of the law." In 2022, The New York Times reporting on transgender issues has been described by critics as "misinformation," "ignoring evidence," and "fearmongering." Critics include the leading professional association on trans health care, the World Professional Association of Transgender Health.

In February 2023, almost 1,000 current and former Times writers and contributors wrote an open letter addressed to Philip B. Corbett, associate managing editor of standards, in which they accused the paper of  publishing articles biased against transgender, non⁠-⁠binary, and gender-nonconforming people. Some of those articles have been referenced in amicus briefs to defend an Alabama law that criminalizes providing treatment for transgender children, the Alabama's Vulnerable Child Compassion and Protection Act. Contributors wrote in the open letter that "the Times has in recent years treated gender diversity with an eerily familiar mix of pseudoscience and euphemistic, charged language, while publishing reporting on trans children that omits relevant information about its sources." The letter references, as one example, an article by Emily Bazelon that "uncritically used the term 'patient zero' to refer to a trans child seeking gender⁠-⁠affirming care, a phrase that vilifies transness as a disease to be feared" (referencing the term for a first-identified patient in an epidemic). Among the signatories of the letter are Cynthia Nixon, Chelsea Manning, Roxane Gay, Jia Tolentino and Sarah Schulman.

A second letter was released the same day, in support of the New York Times contributors. It was co-signed by over one hundred LGBTQ and civil rights groups, including GLAAD, the Human Rights Campaign and PFLAG. The letter described the Times as platforming "fringe theories" and containing "dangerous inaccuracies." Both letters used fact checkers to check sources for articles and op-eds and referenced to the Times history of homophobia from 1963-87 as evidence of previous bias against LGBTQ people. Support for this claim was a ban made by Arthur Ochs Sulzberger on using the word "gay" by anyone writing or editing at the newspaper as well as stigmatizing coverage of gay men and lesbians as well as the start of the AIDS pandemic in the 1980s.

Within a day, The New York Times issued a response, saying, "Our journalism strives to explore, interrogate and reflect the experiences, ideas and debates in society – to help readers understand them. Our reporting did exactly that and we're proud of it." The next day, the Times published an op-ed piece entitled, "In Defense of J.K. Rowling". That same day, an internal memo was sent by the editors, saying, "Our coverage of transgender issues, including the specific pieces singled out for attack, is important, deeply reported, and sensitively written. We do not welcome, and will not tolerate, participation by Times journalists in protests organized by advocacy groups or attacks on colleagues on social media and other public forums."

Coverage of Orthodox Jews

The Times, beginning in 2022 and continuing into 2023, has written eighteen articles, as of March 2023, investigating New York's Orthodox Jewish community, in what Agudath Israel has called antisemitic, and the ADL have said could be a factor in rising antisemitism in New York, specifically against Orthodox Jews. Agudath Israel has started a campaign called "Know Us", aimed at countering the Times negative effects, and pressuring the Times to halt their campaign.

Reputation
The Times has developed a national and international "reputation for thoroughness". Among journalists, the paper is held in high regard; a 1999 survey of newspaper editors conducted by the Columbia Journalism Review found that the Times was the "best" American paper, ahead of The Washington Post, The Wall Street Journal, and Los Angeles Times. The Times also was ranked No. 1 in a 2011 "quality" ranking of U.S. newspapers by Daniel de Vise of The Washington Post; the objective ranking took into account the number of recent Pulitzer Prizes won, circulation, and perceived Web site quality. A 2012 report in WNYC called the Times "the most respected newspaper in the world."

Nevertheless, like many other U.S. media sources, the Times has suffered from a decline in public perceptions of credibility in the U.S. in the early 21st century. A Pew Research Center survey in 2012 asked respondents about their views on credibility of various news organizations. Among respondents who gave a rating, 49% said that they believed "all or most" of the Timess reporting, while 50% disagreed. A large percentage (19%) of respondents were unable to rate believability. The Timess score was comparable to that of USA Today. Media analyst Brooke Gladstone of WNYC's On the Media, writing for The New York Times, says that the decline in U.S. public trust of the mass media can be explained (1) by the rise of the polarized Internet-driven news; (2) by a decline in trust in U.S. institutions more generally; and (3) by the fact that "Americans say they want accuracy and impartiality, but the polls suggest that, actually, most of us are seeking affirmation."

Awards

The New York Times has won 132 Pulitzer Prizes, more than any other newspaper. The prize is awarded for excellence in journalism in a range of categories.

It has also, won three Peabody Awards and jointly received two. Peabody Awards are given for accomplishments in television, radio, and online media.

See also

 List of New York City newspapers and magazines
 List of The New York Times employees
 The New York Times Best Seller list
 The New York Times Guide to Essential Knowledge
 New York Times Index

References

Notes

Citations

Further reading

External links

 
 

 Curated collection of most pre-1923 issues at Online Books Page
  (archives)
 
  
 

 
1851 establishments in New York (state)
Newspapers established in 1851
Daily newspapers published in New York City
New York City local newspapers, in print
Podcasting companies
Tor onion services
Gerald Loeb Award winners for Deadline and Beat Reporting
National newspapers published in the United States
Peabody Award winners
Pulitzer Prize for Explanatory Journalism winners
Pulitzer Prize for International Reporting winners
Pulitzer Prize for National Reporting winners
Pulitzer Prize-winning newspapers